The Main Square Festival is an annual international music festival organized by Live Nation which takes place in the first week-end of July in Arras, France.

Created in 2004 by France Leduc Productions, the festival rose to one of the major music events of the country, attracting worldwide famous bands and stars like Coldplay, Depeche Mode, Placebo, Muse, Indochine, and Pearl Jam.

2004 

The first edition of the Main Square Festival took place on 3 July 2004 on the Grand-Place d'Arras. Gomm performed during the opening act and the headliner was Placebo. 15,000 spectators were present.

2005 

In 2005, Kyo & Sum 41 were the headliners on 3 July. This edition gathered 9,000 spectators.

2006 

The 2006 edition gathered around 45,000 people for a two-day festival on the Grand-Place d'Arras. Depeche Mode, Goldfrapp, Muse, The Kooks & Second Sex were present. During their live show, Muse broadcast live Thierry Henry's goal for France against Brazil in the 2006 World Cup quarter-finals.

2007 

The 2007 edition took place on 30 June and 1 July. The line-up was mainly composed of French artists, including headliners Indochine and Tryo, but also Ayọ, The Sunshiners, Air & Peter von Poehl.

2008 

The 2008 edition marked the beginning of the partnership with Live Nation and a three-day-format. The festival was organized from 4 to 6 July. The line-up was denser and more prestigious than the previous years. The 2008 edition gathered more than 60,000 people on the Grand-Place d'Arras. The Chemical Brothers, Underworld and Justice headlined the first day of the festival alongside Boys Noize and 2 Many DJ's. On the second day, Mika, The Kooks and BB Brunes were the headliners and The Hoosiers, Digitalism and Panic! at the Disco also performed. The final day was headlined by Radiohead while Sigur Rós, The Dø, Vampire Weekend, and The Wombats also performed.

On 7 July, a concert of Quebec star Celine Dion was organized on the Grand-Place d'Arras by Live Nation. Arras, Paris and Nice were the only three French cities on her "Taking Chances World Tour".

On 14 August, Live Nation organized another concert on the Grand-Place d'Arras. The entertainment company brought American heavy metal band Metallica for a show that lasted over two hours.

2009 

In 2009, the festival took place from 2 to 5 July. The four-day-festival was headlined by Coldplay, Kanye West, Placebo and Lenny Kravitz. Despite the prestigious line-up, the tickets were tough to sell. The 4-day pass cost 175€. A few days before the festival, the organizers decided to apply a 40% discount on the tickets.  

Other performers included The Ting Tings, Amy Macdonald, M. Ward, Lily Allen, Phoenix, Birdy Nam Nam, Yuksek, Boys Noize, Kaiser Chiefs, Bloc Party, Gossip, Ghinzu, Expatriate, Crookers, Moby, Franz Ferdinand, Duffy, Katy Perry, Justin Nozuka & Michael Franti.

2010 
The 2010 edition is the first that was held at the Citadelle d'Arras, a UNESCO listed site. The capacity of the new venue is doubled and a new stage is added.

Main Square Festival 

110,000 tickets were sold for the 2010 edition. The headline acts were The Black Eyed Peas, Pearl Jam, Rammstein, and Pink. Many other artists performed, including David Guetta, Jamiroquai, Pony Pony Run Run, La Roux, Vitalic, The Bloody Beetroots, Curry & Coco, Something A La mode, Ben Harper, M, Phoenix, Coheed and Cambria, Julian Casablancas, Gomez, Taylor Hawkins and the Coattail Riders, TV Glory, Gush, Angus & Julia Stone, Hawkins, Art Point M, Gossip, Stereophonics, Florence and the Machine, Yeasayer, Skip The Use, The Bewitched hands, Patrick Watson & Delphic.

Main Square Special 

On 9 July 2010, Live Nation produced a show which featured Prince, Larry Graham et Mint Condition. 22 000 tickets were sold for the show.

2011 
The second edition at the Citadelle d'Arras is known as one of the best pop rock lineup of the festival. The three-day festival gathered around 100 000 spectators during the three days.

Headline acts performed on the Main Stage and included The Chemical Brothers, Linkin Park, Queens Of The Stone Age, Limp Bizkit, Shaka Ponk, The Gaslight Anthem, The Pretty Reckless, Moby, Arcade Fire, The National, Kaiser Chiefs, White Lies, Yodelice, Triggerfinger, Coldplay, Portishead, PJ Harvey, Elbow, Bruno Mars, Charles Bradley, Rival Sons.

Other artists performed on a smaller stage called Greenroom: Martin Solveig, Beady Eye, Eels, Selah Sue, Tame Impala, Jenny & Johnny, Warpaint, Welling Walrus, The Shoes, Kasabian, Two Door Cinema Club, Jimmy Eat World, Fleet Foxes, Aloe Blacc, Everything Everything, Mai, Underworld, Magnetic Man, Cold War Kids, Julian Perretta, Puggy, I Blame Coco, Evaline, Manceau.

2012
The 2012 edition took place from 29 June to 1 July 2012. This edition gathered 25% less spectators than the previous one (75,000). The line-up was criticized for being too "pop".

2013 

In 2013, the Main Square Festival took place from 5 to 7 July. The line-up included Green Day, The Hives, Biffy Clyro, The Prodigy, Bloc Party, Sting, Indochine, Thirty Seconds To Mars, Modestep, Netsky, Mike + The Mechanics, Alt-J, Damien Saez, Of Monsters and Men, Madeon, Stereophonics, Lou Doillon, Modest Mouse.

2014
The Main Square Festival celebrated its 10th anniversary in 2014. For this occasion, the festival announced an attractive line-up on four days.  The first day was dedicated to heavy metal with Iron Maiden as headline act alongside Alice in Chains, Mastodon, and Ghost. Other days included performances from The Black Keys, Franz Ferdinand, Imagine Dragons, Stromae, Paul Kalkbrenner, David Guetta, James Arthur and many more. 

The 2014 edition gathered a record-number of 135,000 spectators.
July 3
Iron Maiden
Alice in Chains
Mastodon
Ghost

July 4
The Black Keys
Franz Ferdinand
Skrillex
Imagine Dragons
Woodkid
Gesaffelstein
Triggerfinger

July 5
Stromae
Paul Kalkbrenner
Jack Johnson
MGMT
Foals
Disclosure
John Butler Trio
Yodelice
Arsenal

July 6
David Guetta
-M-
Detroit
Rodrigo y Gabriela
London Grammar
Girls in Hawaii
Bakermat
James Arthur

2015
For the 2015 edition, the festival went back to its three-day format. Headline acts included Muse, Lenny Kravitz and Pharrell Williams.

July 3
Lenny Kravitz
Shaka Ponk
The Script
Hozier
George Ezra
Rone
Lindsey Stirling
Kodaline
Patrice
Sheppard

July 4
Muse
Skip the Use
Royal Blood
Madeon
Fakear 
James Bay
BØRNS
Circa Waves

July 5
Pharrell Williams
Sam Smith
Mumford & Sons
Lilly Wood and the Prick
IAM
The Avener
Tiken Jah Fakoly
Oscar & The Wolf
Rudimental 
ILoveMakonnen

2016
The 2016 edition took place from 1 to 3 July. The festival was headlined by Iggy Pop, Disclosure, Macklemore & Ryan Lewis, and Les Insus.

2017
The 2017 edition gathered 36 artists for a three-day festival. Radiohead was the main act and performed during a 2h30 show on the last day.  
30 June
System of a Down
Above & Beyond
Biffy Clyro
Soulwax
Vitalic ODC 
Machine Gun Kelly
Frank Carter & The Rattlesnakes
Don Broco
The Inspector Cluzo
The Noface

1 July
Major Lazer
Die Antwoord
Kungs
Jain
Kaleo
Dirtyphonics
Xavier Rudd
Rag'n'Bone Man
Vald
Cage the Elephant
Talisco
Walking on Cars

2 July
Radiohead
Savages
Seasick Steve
La Femme
Mark Lanegan Band
Highly Suspect
Thylacine
The Lemon Twigs
Naive New Beaters
Spoon
Kensington

2018
36 artists were present for the 2018 edition. Headline acts were Queens of the Stone Age, Depeche Mode and Orelsan. 

6 July
Queens of the Stone Age
Nekfeu
Gojira
Paul Kalkbrenner
The Breeders

7 July
Depeche Mode
Liam Gallagher
Oscar & The Wolf
Feder
The Blaze
BB Brunes
Wolf Alice

8 July
Jamiroquai
Orelsan
IAM
Portugal. The Man
Girls in Hawaii
Loïc Nottet

2019 
The 2019 edition took place in La Citadelle d'Arras from 5 July to 7 July 2019. It was the 15th edition. On 5 July, the line-up included various artists including DJ Snake, Christine & the Queens, Damso, Cypress Hill, Angèle, Lizzo, Miles Kane. On 6 July, Martin Garrix, Skip The Use, Masego among others performed. On 7 July, the line-up included John Butler Trio, Bigflo & Oli, Editors, Jain, Ben Harper and others.

2020 & 2021 
2020 and 2021 editions were cancelled due to COVID-19 pandemic.

2022 
The 2022 edition took place from 30 June to 3 July 2022, with four days of festival. The headline acts were DJ Snake, Sting, Black Eyed Peas, and Twenty One Pilots. The Pixies were originally scheduled to play on 2 July but they cancelled due to a Covid-19 infection in the group. They were replaced by French band Inspecteur Cluzo.

2023 
The 2023 edition will take place from 30 June to July 2 2023, going back to a three-day-format. The organisation increased the prices of the tickets. Three-day passes went from 129€ in 2022 to 155€ in 2023. The line-up will include artists such as Aya Nakamura, David Guetta, Macklemore, Maroon 5, John Butler, Kungs, Tiakola.

2024 
In 2024, the Main Square Festival will celebrate its 20th anniversary. However, the 2024 edition will not be the 20th as two editions were cancelled in 2020 and 2021.

References 

Rock festivals in France
Electronic music festivals in France